The 1989 European Judo Championships were held 11-14 May 1989 in Helsinki, Finland.

Results

Men

60 kg

65 kg

71 kg

78 kg

86 kg

95 kg

95+ kg

Open class

Women

48 kg

52 kg

56 kg

61 kg

66 kg

72 kg

72+ kg

Open class

References 
 

European Judo Championships
European Judo Championships
May 1989 sports events in Europe
Judo competitions in Finland
1989 in Finland
International sports competitions in Helsinki
1980s in Helsinki